Honoré Boyer de Fonscolombe (1683–1743) was a French aristocrat, lawyer and public official.

Biography

Early life 
Honoré Boyer de Fonscolombe was born in 1683. His father, Denis Boyer, was a Consul in the Parliament of Aix-en-Provence.

Career 
He made his fortune by selling furniture and silk in Aix-en-Provence.

He became a prosecutor in the Parliament of Aix-en-Provence in 1726. He was appointed Secretary to King Louis XV of France (1710–1774) on 11 November 1741. As a result of this appointment, he earned the marquisate of Fonscolombe (inherited by all his direct male heirs).

Personal life 
He was married to Jeanne Carnaud. They had five sons and five daughters:
 Jean-Baptiste-Laurent Boyer de Fonscolombe.
 Luc Boyer de Fonscolombe.
 Jean-Baptiste Boyer de Fonscolombe.
 Joseph Boyer de Fonscolombe.
 Antoine Boyer de Fonscolombe.

In 1720, he commissioned the Château de Fonscolombe in Le Puy-Sainte-Réparade, listed as a monument historique since 1989. In 1743 (shortly before his death), he also inherited the Hôtel Boyer de Fonscolombe on the Rue de Gaston de Saporta in Aix from his late sister, listed as a monument historique since 1989.

He died in 1743. Étienne Laurent Joseph Hippolyte Boyer de Fonscolombe (1772–1853) and Emmanuel de Fonscolombe (1810–1875) were two of his descendants.

References 

1683 births
1743 deaths
People from Aix-en-Provence
18th-century French lawyers
Louis XV